Has Head, Hand, Feet and Heart is a watercolor by Paul Klee painted in 1930. It is held at the Kunstsammlung Nordrhein-Westfalen, in Düsseldorf, which acquired this painting in 1960 with the collection of the Pittsburgh entrepreneur G. David Thompson.

History
The origin of the title of the picture is unclear. On one hand, the Bauhaus Dessau organised a "bart-herzen-nase-fest" (beard heart-nose festival) in 1928, at which Klee's student Herbert Bayer was also present. On the other hand, Klee chose the title Nase, Mund, Brüste; Büste, Lippen, Brüste (nose, mouth, breasts; bust, lips, breasts) for another work as early as 1927. Klee's friend Hans Arp also created a painting called Kopf, Augen, Nase, Schnurrbart (Head, eyes, nose, moustache).

Description
A small red heart is centrally located in a broad pale red cross that extends almost across the entire image. In the upper left-hand corner, in the manner of a child's drawing, a stylized head with a white headband, plate-round blue eyes without pupils, the nose marked by a thin line, below it a tiny mouth, indicated by two parallel lines.
Clockwise, in the next corners, on each elongated grey-blue colour spot, there follows a stick with one hand, a stick with hand and foot and another stick with a foot, which, like the other parts of the body, is executed in a pale red colour. The ground of the picture is in a broken white with slight grey or blue-grey shadows on the ground and in the upper left corner of the picture.

Interpretation
The watercolour is seen as a disguised depiction of Christ with a parodistic undertone. With regard to the blasphemy trial against George Grosz, Klee wanted to avoid a possible blasphemy accusation. The picture shows an atheistic position, clearly documented from text and picture testimonies of the artist from his entire creative period.

Reception
In 1999, Marianne Schroeder was influenced by the watercolour for her composition Wie der Klee vierblättrig wurde (How the clover became four-leaved). The work was premiered by the Ensemble Sortisatio and recorded on the CD 8 Pieces on Paul Klee.

See also
List of works by Paul Klee

Notes

References

1930 paintings
Paintings by Paul Klee
Watercolor paintings
Paintings in Düsseldorf